Route 405 or Highway 405 may refer to:

Canada
 Manitoba Provincial Road 405
 Newfoundland and Labrador Route 405
 Ontario Highway 405

Costa Rica
 National Route 405

Japan
 Japan National Route 405

United Kingdom
 A405 road

United States
  Interstate 405
 Interstate 405 (California), a bypass of Los Angeles, California
 Interstate 405 (Oregon), a bypass of Portland, Oregon
 Interstate 405 (Washington), a bypass of Seattle, Washington
 Florida:
  Florida State Road 405
  County Road 405 (Brevard County, Florida)
  Georgia State Route 405 (unsigned designation for Interstate 95)
  Maryland Route 405
 New York:
  New York State Route 405 (former)
 County Route 405 (Albany County, New York)
  County Route 405 (Erie County, New York)
  Pennsylvania Route 405
  Puerto Rico Highway 405
  Virginia State Route 405